Ashton Vale is a suburb located in the Bedminster ward of Bristol, United Kingdom.It Is located in the very south-western edge of the city. Ashton Vale has a mixture of residential and light industry.

It is served by Ashton Vale Primary School.

Ashton Vale was the home of British Cellophane in the 1980s.

The Portishead Railway runs along the eastern edge of the suburb and the Bristol to Taunton Line runs along the south. The nearest station is Parson Street railway station. Which is also near the proposed Ashton Gate railway station.

Sport
Bristol City F.C. were planning to build a stadium in the area, to be called Bristol City Stadium to replace Ashton Gate Stadium. However the land nearby is used for recreational purposes and residents have proposed that the land should be classified as a village green. The decision for the development plans was to be decided in late 2013 but plans have been postponed pending development of Ashton Gate Stadium.

Ashton Vale is the base of Bristol Indoor Bowls Club.

References

Areas of Bristol
Places formerly in Somerset